The British National Individual Sprint Championships are held annually as part of the British National Track Championships organised by British Cycling. The men's championship was inaugurated in 1930 and won by Sydney Cozens.

Men's Senior Race

Am = Amateur event / Pro = Professional event

Women's Senior Race

Men's Junior Race

Women's Junior Race

Male Youth Race

Female Youth Race

References

Cycle racing in the United Kingdom
National track cycling championships
National championships in the United Kingdom
Annual sporting events in the United Kingdom